Tintoretto is a crater on Mercury.  Its name was adopted by the IAU in 1976, after the Italian painter Tintoretto.

Tintoretto is west of the larger crater Sōtatsu and southwest of Po Ya crater.

References

Impact craters on Mercury